Mark Izu is an American jazz double bass player and composer. He is of Japanese ancestry and frequently combines jazz with Asian traditional musics (particularly the ancient Japanese court music known as gagaku) in his compositions.  He has performed with Anthony Brown and Jon Jang. Izu is a seminal leader in the Asian American Jazz movement. His compositions include symphony, film, theater, dance and jazz. The principal curator of the original Asian American Jazz Festival held at the Asian Art Museum in San Francisco’s Golden Gate Park for nearly two decades, he helped establish the genre. In addition to the double bass, he also plays the Japanese shō and Chinese sheng (both mouth organs).

He lives in San Francisco, California, with his wife, playwright and performer Brenda Wong Aoki, and son (Kai Kāne Aoki Izu).

Mark Izu received a Northern California Regional Emmy Award for outstanding Musical Composition/Arrangement for his score for Bolinao 52, a film about the Vietnamese boat people, which also received an Emmy Award for Outstanding Documentary.

Discography
Navarasa: Duets for Shakuhachi & Contrabass (2010) 
Legend of Morning Glory (2010) 
Threading Time (2007) 
Mermaid Meat (2007) 
Last Dance (2002) 
Dragon Painter (2007)

Recordings
Cat Chat, Tokyo Broadcast System (1999) TBS CD ROM 
Duke Ellington’s Far East Suite, Asian American Orchestra (1999) 
The Queen’s Garden, Brenda Wong Aoki (1998) 
Dreams & Illusions: Tales of the Pacific Rim, with Brenda Aoki 
Circle of Fire, Mark Izu & Circle of Fire 
San Francisco Jazz Festival 96 
Tiananmen, Jon Jang & The Pan Asian Arkestra Soul Note 
Quest, Michael West 
Live in Berlin, United Front 
Whats the Difference Between Stripping and Playing the Violin? with Miya Masaoka 
Family, Anthony Brown 
Big Bands Behind Bared Wire, Asian American Jazz Orchestra (1998) 
Jang, Jon Jang 
Song for Manong, Fred Houn 
Never Give Up, Jon Jang & The Pan Asian Arkestra 
Self Defense, Jon Jang & The Pan Asian Arkestra Soul Note 
Francis Wong, Francis Wong & the Great Wall Ensemble 
Crystalization of the Mind, Jason Michaels 
In Xinjiang Time, Phonix Spring Ensemble, Betty Wong OWR 
Travel of a Zen Babtist, Mark Izu/Lewis Jordan 
Are You Chinese or Charlie Chan, Jon Jang 
Ohm: Unit of Resistance, United Front 
Of Blues Myself & I, Ray Collins 
Path with a Heart, United Front
Monk Anthony Brown ‘s Asian American Orchestra 
Russel Hisashi Baba, Russel Baba

External links

Mark Izu page

See also
Asian American jazz

Year of birth missing (living people)
Living people
American jazz double-bassists
Male double-bassists
American jazz composers
American male jazz composers
American musicians of Japanese descent
Shō players
Jazz musicians from California
21st-century double-bassists
21st-century American male musicians